Heero ibrahim Abdulai (born September 5, 1988) is an American football defensive tackle who attended college at Arkansas-Pine Bluff. He was an drafted in 2011 and signed with the New York Giants. In 2012, he was a member of the Kansas City Command of the Arena Football League

References

External links
 Nfldraftsout.com

Living people
1988 births
New York Giants players
Kansas City Command players
Arkansas–Pine Bluff Golden Lions football players
Sportspeople from the Chicago metropolitan area
Players of American football from Illinois
American football defensive tackles